Rajiv B. Lall is the managing director and vice chairman of Infrastructure Development Finance Company (IDFC) in India. His father K.B. Lall was a member of Indian Civil Service.

Early life and education
Lall was born on 2 August 1957. acquired a B.A. (Hons) degree in politics, philosophy, and economics  from the Oxford University and Ph.D. in Economics from Columbia University. He is conversant in French and can Spanish and Mandarin.
Rajiv Lall resides in Mumbai, and is married to Bunty Chand, the executive director of the Indian chapter of the John Rockefeller-founded Asia Society.
He also has a home in Singapore.

Career

Before joining Warburg Pincus in 1997, Rajiv Lall was the Head of Asian Economic Research with Morgan Stanley Asia Limited. In 2005, Lall joined IDFC as MD and CEO. he serves as a director of IDFC Trustee Company Pvt. Ltd., IDFC Capital Company Limited, IDFC Projects Limited, IDFC-SSKI Securities Limited, IDFC-SSKI Limited, IDFC Bank, STCI Finance Limited, National Stock Exchange of India Limited, Spandana Sphoorty Finance Limited, Delhi Integrated Multi- Modal Transit System Limited, Qualitas Healthcare, and IDFC Private Equity. During his career spanning over two decades, he was worked with the World Bank, Warburg Pincus, Morgan Stanley and Asian Development Bank. He was also an assistant professor at Florida Atlantic University.

During  Lall's tenure, IDFC became India’s biggest infrastructure finance company with balance sheet worth more than ₨ 60,000 crore.

Social interests
Lok Foundation, along with Lok Capital Group, provides social venture capital to promote social entrepreneurship in education, healthcare and low-cost housing segments.

References

External links
 CV on US - India CEO Forum
 Profile on IDFC official website
 Interview on ET Now
 Profile on Lok Capital official website
 World Economic Forum - Dr. Rajiv Lall

Businesspeople from Chennai
Living people
1957 births
IDFC First Bank